The steppe lemming or steppe vole (Lagurus lagurus) is a small, plump, light-grey rodent, similar in appearance to the Norway lemming (Lemmus lemmus), but not in the same genus.  The steppe lemming eats shoots and leaves and is more active at night, though it is not strictly nocturnal. In the wild, it is found in Russia and Ukraine in steppes and semiarid environments. Fossil remains of this species have been found in areas as far west as Great Britain.

Description
The steppe lemming has a body length of up to 12 cm and a tail of 2 cm, a little shorter than the hind foot. It weighs about 30 g. The eyes and ears are small and the fur is a uniform shade of brownish-grey with a black dorsal stripe.

Distribution
This lemming is found in steppe, forest-steppe and semidesert parts of western Mongolia, northwest China, many parts of the former USSR, Kazakhstan, Ukraine, the southern and middle Ural, and western and eastern Siberia.

Ecology
The steppe lemming is a colonial species digging lengthy burrows. It has a partially underground mode of life, being active during the day, but only going above the surface for short periods. It feeds on various parts of plants, including seeds. It reaches sexual maturity at the age of six weeks and can produce up to six broods in a year, with five or six young in each. Under favourable conditions, reproduction continues throughout the year. The numbers of steppe lemmings vary greatly according to climatic conditions and the availability of food. Migrations are observed during years of mass outbreaks.

Steppe lemmings as pets

It is the most common domestic vole, being particularly well known in Europe. (In the US and Canada, it is still considered an exotic animal.)

In captivity, they can live over two years, but they are usually mistreated with small cages (a 10-gallon tank is best for a colony) and improper diets. Although the steppe lemming is social by nature and should not be held in captivity alone, if a colony of steppe lemmings is held together for a long period of time (two to three months) they may become hostile to each other (mainly to the subordinate members of the colony).  If there is only one separate nesting area, two entrances or exits should be placed, due to the attack style of the more impetuous lemmings. They also tend to be very territorial animals, so a low male population is best in captivity. Overall, three to eight steppe lemmings in one cage or aquarium is ideal, with no more than one male for every two or three females.

Standard rodent food containing bits of dried fruit is not appropriate; as their natural diets do not contain much sugar, steppe lemmings are somewhat diabetic, and become sick or even die from overdosing on sugar. A sugar-free, no molasses food that does not contain dried fruit and little sunflower and other oily seeds should be used; laboratory rodent foods may be a cheap alternative. Additionally, steppe lemmings need grass and other leafy greens, such as alfalfa, to thrive.

Grass gathered outdoors may harbor parasites and toxins and should not be used unless gathered from meadows away from inhabited areas, roads and not frequented by dogs or used for grazing. No matter where any grass or moss has been obtained, and even if it is only intended for bedding, it should be kept in a freezer for three days to eliminate parasites such as lice and mites.

Clean water should be always available; the amount actually drunk varies with the food consumed. Willow twigs need to be provided for abrading the continuously growing teeth. Lemmings can drink from a shallow dish, but since they typically track their bedding into the water, a bottle with a ball valve is better.

Lemmings enjoy any kind of running or climbing; however, as their habitat is essentially flat and rather featureless terrain, they have a poor sense of height and danger, so their enclosures should not be high enough to allow them to fall more than 10–15 cm and should, of course, be lined with wood chips and hay. An exercise wheel is the best way to keep the animals busy and trim, and if the wheels afford enough space, they will often race in it together. (However, fights can often develop around wheels - with males, particularly, it is helpful to have several wheels, perhaps even one for each lemming.)

Aggression

Motives for fighting
In general, steppe lemmings are friendly animals and prefer to live in colonies. Even small groups of males (preferably from the same litter) can live quite peacefully. However, males do tend to be territorial and a mature alpha male will nearly always attack a stranger and will often mistreat other members of his own litter, particularly if the nest is overcrowded. A large, well-filled terrarium (about 5–10 cm wood chips covered by about 10 cm of hay) can allow a group to live far more peacefully; altercations should be expected in smaller spaces with little bedding.

Fights (as well as unintentional accidents) can also occur in and around exercise wheels.

Once a male has become aggressive - even with an outsider - he should be considered dangerous, watched very closely and - if possible - be neutered and placed with a group of females. Although neutering a lemming is a difficult operation typically attempted only by veterinary hospitals, it is possible.  A neutered alpha male will generally not become less aggressive toward other males.

Fights, wounds and necessary precautions
The aggressor will try to trap the defending lemming in a corner and then attack with his teeth and short claws. Excited chirps, chattering and running typically accompany a fight - in most cases, the whole colony will be disturbed. (While activity of this kind is amusing for new owners, it should be observed very carefully, since peaceful lemming colonies are much quieter than ones characterized by aggressive behavior.)

Since lemmings like to nest in small, narrow enclosures (like boxes the size of a fist), it is important for the enclosure have a second exit, so the defender can escape into another part of the terrarium. Lemming fights sometimes leave no exterior signs of violence, but can cause fatal internal bleeding. More often, fights result in lacerations, often around the hind legs, bottom and genitals.

Lemmings hurt in a fight should be placed in terraria or cages separate from the aggressor as soon as possible. Also, their natural tendency to scratch and lick at wounds can cause slow healing. A veterinarian may prescribe antibiotics and infection retardants to help an injured lemming, generally at reasonable costs. While it can be very difficult to convince an injured lemming to drink its medicated drops or eat food laced with medicine, a good trick is to place drops of medicine on the lemming's nose. Through licking itself clean, the lemming will ingest the medicine.

References

External links

Information about Steppe Lemmings
Picture of Steppe Lemming

Voles and lemmings
Rodents of Europe
Mammals described in 1773